David Chandler Thomas (born July 27, 1954) is an American economist and technology executive, who is a professor at Ball State University, where he performs research into public health and business cycles. He currently serves on the advisory board of the College of Health and Human Services at George Mason University.

Business and Corporate Experience

Founder and CEO - Cyma Software 
Thomas created one of the earliest PC accounting software companies, which he sold to McGraw-Hill Book Company in 1984.

Founder and CEO - Intacct Corporation 
In 1999 Thomas, along with co-founder Odysseas Tsatalos, launched Intacct Corporation, which was acquired by Sage Group in 2017 in deal purported to be 850 million dollars.

Industry Association Executive 
Dr. Thomas has served as the representative for the tech industry as the executive director for the Software Industry Association ( 2004 - 2009) and as Executive Vice President of TechAmerica in Washington, DC.

Education and personal life
Thomas was born in 1954 in Maricopa County, Arizona.

He graduated from California State University with a Bachelor of Arts degree in economics in 2010 and received his PhD in economics from George Mason University in 2015 with his dissertation titled  Empirical Studies of Emergency Response Services (9-1-1) and an Examination of Moral Hazard in Health Insurance. At George Mason, he was mentored by econometrican Thomas Stratmann. He is married to Gayle Bradshaw Thomas.

References

External links

1954 births
Living people
20th-century American economists
21st-century American economists
George Mason University alumni
Ball State University faculty